Kabir (c. 1440–c. 1518) was a mystic poet and saint of India.

Kabir or the alternative Kabeer may also refer to:

People

Given name
Kabir
Kabir Ali, English cricketer
Kabir Akhtar, American television director and Emmy Award-winning editor
Kabir Bedi, Indian television and film actor
Kabir Duhan Singh, Indian film actor
Kabir Hashim, Sri Lankan politician and economist
Kabir Khan (cricketer), Pakistani cricketer
Kabir Khan (director), Indian film director, screenwriter and cinematographer
Kabir Sadanand, Indian actor and film director
Kabir Stori, Afghan poet and writer
Kabir Suman, Indian singer, songwriter, music director, poet, novelist, journalist
Kabeer
Kabeer Gbaja-Biamila, American football defensive end
Kabeer Kaushik, Indian film director and screenwriter playwright

Surname
Kabir
Alamgir Kabir (film maker), Bangladeshi film director
Alamgir Kabir (cricketer), Bangladeshi test cricketer
Amir Kabir (1807–1852), Persian politician
Altamas Kabir, a Chief Justice of India
Fazle Kabir, Bangladeshi economist and banker
Humayun Kabir, Bengali poet, novelist, educationist and politician.
Jayasree Kabir, Bengali film actress
Rez Kabir, Bangladeshi-born British stage and film actor
Rezaul Kabir, Bangladeshi financial economist
Sanober Kabir, Indian Bollywood actress

El Kabir
Moestafa El Kabir, Moroccan footballer

Kabeer
Naila Kabeer, Indian-born British Bangladeshi social economist, researcher and writer
Rokeya Rahman Kabeer, Bangladeshi academic and feminist

Al Kabeer
Hasabu Al-Kabeer, Sudanese footballer

Places
Kabir, Kerman, a village in Kerman Province, Iran
Kabir, Razavi Khorasan, a village in Razavi Khorasan Province, Iran

Other uses
 Kabir (teacher), Harari title
Kabir, a kind of Bedouin arbitrator, see Bedouin systems of justice
 Kabir (film), a 2018 Bengali film
Kabir Singh, a 2019 Hindi film
Bhakta Kabir, a 1942 Indian film
Mahatma Kabir (disambiguation)
Mahatma Kabir (film), a 1947 Indian Kannada-language film
Mahathma Kabir, a 1962 Indian Kannada film
The Suite Life of Karan & Kabir, sitcom on Disney Channel India

See also
Kabiri (disambiguation)
Al-Kabir (disambiguation)
Mubarak Al-Kabeer (disambiguation)
Saud al-Kabir (disambiguation)